The Transportation coils series is a set of definitive stamps issued by the United States Postal Service between 1981 and 1995. Officially dubbed the "Transportation Issue" or "Transportation Series", they have come to be called the "transportation coils" because all of the denominations were issued in coil stamp format. All values except three were printed by the Bureau of Engraving and Printing.

The theme of the series was historical transportation vehicles used in the United States since its independence. The designs are spare, consisting only of the vehicle itself, and with inscriptions describing the general type ("Circus Wagon" or "Ferryboat") and a date, either a decade or sometimes a specific year. The stamps are primarily engraved, almost all in a single color on plain white paper (the $1 seaplane is in two colors). Some of the denominations also received special service inscriptions in black, such as "Bulk Rate" or "ZIP + 4 Presort". Many of those denominations were unusual decimal rates, such as 16.7 or 24.1 cents, used by bulk mailers and other businesses who also used precancels.  Decimal rates had previously appeared on some coils of the 1975 Americana series.

Plate numbers were printed in small letters at the bottom of the stamps at intervals of twenty-four, forty-eight, or fifty-two depending on the printing press employed and these stamps are known as plate number coils.  The series has become popular with stamp collectors, both because of the "classic" engraved designs, and because to the emergence of the plate number collecting.  Many issues with specific plate numbers are hard to find and can be valuable.

Stamps of the series (ordered by denomination, not issue date):
 1¢ Omnibus
 2¢ Locomotive
 3¢ Handcar
 3¢ Conestoga
 3.4¢ School Bus
 4¢ Stagecoach
 4¢ Steam Carriage
 4.9¢ Buckboard
 5¢ Motorcycle
 5¢ Milk wagon
 5¢ Circus wagon
 5¢ Canoe
 5.2¢ Sleigh
 5.3¢ Elevator
 5.5¢ Star Route Truck
 5.9¢ Bicycle
 6¢ Tricycle
 7.1¢ Tractor
 7.4¢ Baby Buggy
 7.6¢ Carreta
 8.3¢ Ambulance
 8.4¢ Wheel Chair
 8.5¢ Tow Truck
 9.3¢ Mail Wagon
 10¢ Canal Boat
 10¢ Tractor Trailer
 10.1¢ Oil Wagon
 10.9¢ Hansom Cab
 11¢ Caboose
 11¢ Stutz Bearcat
 12¢ Stanley Steamer
 12.5¢ Pushcart
 13¢ Patrol Wagon
 13.2¢ Coal Car
 14¢ Iceboat
 15¢ Tugboat
 16.7¢ Popcorn Wagon
 17¢ Electric Auto
 17¢ Dog Sled
 17.5¢ Racing Car
 18¢ Surrey
 20¢ Fire Pumper
 20¢ Cable Car
 20¢ Cog Railway
 20.5¢ Fire Engine
 21¢ Railway Mail Car
 23¢ Lunch Wagon
 24.1¢ Tandem Bike
 25¢ Bread Wagon
 32¢ Ferry Boat
 $1 Sea Plane

References and sources
Notes

Sources
Scott catalog

Further reading
 Agris, Joseph. The Transportation Coils and Other Plate Number Coils Issues. Houston, TX.: Eclectic Publishing, 1987 332p.
 Lawrence, Ken. "A Tribute to Transportation Coils." The American Philatelist. 105(6) (June 1991), p. 530-541.
 Winick, Les. The United States Transportation Coils. Florham Park, N.J.: The Washington Press, 1988 4p.

Postage stamps of the United States